Ulusal Kanal is a private Turkish nationwide TV channel established in 2000 broadcasting news and politics. It is linked with the Patriotic Party and was raided by police in 2011 as part of the Ergenekon investigation. Broadcast is done in 576i@50 fields/s SD despite having 1080i HD broadcast equipment. Ulusal Kanal is partly financed by ads and partly by merchandise.

See also 
 Patriotic Party

References

External links 

Ulusal Kanal Merchandise

Television stations in Turkey
Television channels and stations established in 2000